The Winnipeg Thunder was a professional basketball franchise based in Winnipeg, Manitoba, from 1992 to 1994. The Thunder played its inaugural season in the World Basketball League, which folded before the schedule ended. The club then joined the nascent National Basketball League, where it played for the 1993 and 1994 seasons.

The Thunder enjoyed considerable public and corporate support at the outset, which later dwindled due in part to league instability and increased competition in the local minor-league sports market, following the establishment of the Winnipeg Goldeyes baseball club. The club's financial backers included Sam Katz and John Loewen. 

The Thunder played its home games at the Winnipeg Arena.

References

National Basketball League (Canada) teams
Sports teams in Winnipeg
Defunct basketball teams in Canada
World Basketball League teams
Basketball teams established in 1992
Sports clubs disestablished in 1994
1992 establishments in Manitoba
1994 disestablishments in Manitoba
Basketball in Manitoba